When We Reach That Old Port Somewhere In France is a World War I song written by Albert Selden and composed by Sam H. Stept. The song was first published in 1917 by Stasny Music Co., in New York, NY. The sheet music cover depicts a soldier and a woman embracing with an artillery unit in the background and an inset photo of Anna Chandler.

The sheet music can be found at the Pritzker Military Museum & Library.

References 

Bibliography
Parker, Bernard S. World War I Sheet Music Vol 2. Jefferson: McFarland & Company, Inc., 2007. . 
The Saturday evening post. Vol 190 1917. Indianapolis [etc.]: Saturday Evening Post Co.

1917 songs
Songs of World War I
Songs about France
Songs with music by Sam H. Stept